Colder may refer to:

The comparative of cold
Colder (musician), French electronic producer
"Colder", a song by Charon from the album Songs for the Sinners
"Colder", a song by Nina Nesbitt from the album The Sun Will Come Up, the Seasons Will Change
Agent Colder, a fictional character played by Tanya Robb in the British web series Corner Shop Show
Mary Frances Colder (1818–1854), African American journalist and abolitionist